The Eredivisie 2008–09 is the 53rd season of Eredivisie since its establishment in 1955. PSV were the reigning champions. The season began on 29 August 2008 with a game between Vitesse Arnhem and FC Groningen and ended on 10 May 2009. A total of 18 teams take part in the league, consisting of 16 who competed in the previous season and two promoted from the Eerste Divisie. The teams promoted from the Eerste Divisie at the end of the previous season were champions FC Volendam, and play-off winners ADO Den Haag. AZ clinched their second title, their first coming in 1981.

Overview

League table

Results

Top goalscorers

Last updated: 11 May 2009 Source: ESPN Top Scorers

Play-offs

European competition (best of 3)
Contrary to the play-offs of previous years, only teams placed 6th through 9th compete in a play-off tournament for one spot in the second qualifying round of the UEFA Europa League 2009–10.

Semi-finals

|}

Final

|}

Relegation
The 16th and 17th placed teams, along with the teams from Eerste Divisie, participate in a play-off for two spots in 2009–10 Eredivisie.

Round 1

Round 2 (best of 3)

|}

Round 3 (best of 3)

|}

RKC Waalwijk and Roda JC will play in Eredivisie 2009–10.

Facts and statistics
 Ajax lost the opening match 2–1 away at Willem II. This was Ajax' first opening round defeat since the 1988–89 season.
 Ajax and Feyenoord both lost their opening matches. The last times this happened was in the 1965–66 season.
 ADO Den Haag topped the league table after two matches. The last time ADO was in first place was on 16 January 1971.
 NAC Breda led the Eredivisie after round six. This was the first time in club history that NAC were in first place of the Eredivisie.
 A record 6,067,288 spectators passed through the turnstiles, an average of 19,827 per match.

Television rights
The Dutch public broadcaster NOS broadcast the match highlights after beating rival broadcaster RTL for the contract. The new pay-per-view channel Eredivisie Live broadcast the live matches.

In Australia the Eredivisie was broadcast live and exclusive by Setanta Sports.

See also
 2008–09 Eerste Divisie
 2008–09 KNVB Cup

References

Eredivisie seasons
Netherlands
1